The Jain community celebrated a presence of 100 years in Singapore marking the occasion by rededicating the "Stanak" and consecrating the idol of Mahavira. This brings together the two main sects of Jains - Svetambara and Digambara. The Singapore Jain Religious Society engages in keeping traditions and practices alive by transmitting Jain principles to the next generation. It also has a strong history of community involvement. The community has no temple, but the Singapore Jain Religious Society has a building at 18 Jalan Yasin.

, there are 1,500 Jains in Singapore.

History
Jains have settled in Singapore since the beginning of this century just before or after the first world war (1910 – 1914).

Jain unity
According to the Singapore Jain Religious Society's constitution, any Jain whether Svetambara or Digambar, speaking any language could become a member and carry out Jain religious activities, keeping to fundamental principles of Jainism.

Singapore Tamil Jains Forum
Singapore has a huge population of Tamils and thus also has a small community of Tamil Jains. The Tamil Jains in Singapore congregate under the banner of Singapore Tamil Jains Forum. The forum is headed by Dharmanathan Varthamanan.

References

External links
 Singapore Jain Religious Society

Singapore
Singapore
Religion in Singapore
Jain communities
Singapore